Alectoria is a genus of fruticose lichens belonging to the family Parmeliaceae.

Species
Alectoria brodoana  – Mexico
Alectoria gowardii  – Northwest Territories
Alectoria imshaugii 
Alectoria lata  – North America; Central America; Asia
Alectoria mexicana  – Mexico
Alectoria ochroleuca 
Alectoria ochroleucoides  – Mexico
Alectoria sarmentosa 
Alectoria sorediosa 
Alectoria spiculatosa  – Yunnan, China

Gallery

References

Parmeliaceae
Lecanorales genera
Lichen genera
Taxa named by Erik Acharius
Taxa described in 1809